Shalkar is a lake in Aiyrtau District, North Kazakhstan Region, Kazakhstan.

Aiyrtau village lies a little to the south of the southwestern tip of the lake and Shalkar village to the southeast of the eastern tip. There are resorts by the lakeshore. Lake Shalkar is part of the Kokshetau National Park, a protected area.

Geography
Shalkar lies in the western sector of the Kokshetau Lakes. It is an elongated lake stretching in an ENE-WSW direction with a cove at the eastern end. The bottom of lake Shalkar is flat, with sandy and rocky areas. There are three islets near the eastern shore of the lake. The water is slightly brackish.

The Koi-Bagir river flows into the lake during the spring floods from the northwestern side. The outflow of lake Shalkar is river Tyun-Tyugur, flowing southwards from the southwestern end.

Flora and fauna
There are forests close to the southern shore of the lake, with birch, aspen and sea buckthorn, among other trees and shrubs. 
From the fish species living in the lake, the perch is autochthonous. The least cisco, peled, carp, Prussian carp and crucian carp found in lake Shalkar have been introduced.

See also
List of lakes of Kazakhstan

References

External links
Kokshetau National Park - Central-asia.guide
Kokshetau National Park - kazakhstan.travel

Lakes of Kazakhstan
North Kazakhstan Region
Kazakh Uplands

ru:Шалкар (озеро, Северо-Казахстанская область)